The Best of Bucky and John Pizzarelli is a compilation album of song choices selected from the combined careers of Bucky Pizzarelli and John Pizzarelli from the 1990s, released in 2006 by LRC, Ltd.

Track listing 
Disc 1
Besame Mucho
Triste
One Note Samba
Girl from Ipanema
Line for Lyons
I Found a New Baby
Orchids in Moonlight
Maybe This Summer
S'wonderful
Day in the Life of a Fool
Meditation
Disc 2
Song Is You
I Dream Too Much
Why Do I Love You
Smoke Gets in Your Eyes
Can't Help Lovin Dat Man
Sure Thing
Pick Yourself Up
Bill
Yesterdays
Why Was I Born
I'm Old Fashioned
All the Things You Are
Remind Me
Nobody Else But Me
Azure'te
Disc 3
Sing Sing Sing
Little World Called Home
Pick Yourself Up
Nuages
Honeysuckle Rose
Willow Weep for Me
Tangerine
Medley: It's Been a Long Time/Don't Take Your Love from Me
Two Funky People
Come Rain or Come Shine
Stompin' at the Savoy

Personnel
Bucky Pizzarelliguitar
John Pizzarellivocals, guitar

2006 greatest hits albums
Bucky Pizzarelli albums
John Pizzarelli albums